Abegglen is a surname. People with this surname include:

 Max Abegglen (1902–1970), Swiss footballer
 André Abegglen (1909–1944), Swiss footballer
 James Abegglen (1926–2007), American, later Japanese, businessman and professor in management
 Ron Abegglen (1937–2018), American college basketball coach
 Nico Abegglen (born 1990), Swiss footballer
 Cameron Abegglen (born 2001), South African rugby player, origin-Switzerland 

Swiss-German surnames